Softball at the 2019 Southeast Asian Games was held at the Clark International Sports Complex in Mabalacat, Pampanga, the Philippines from 2 to 8 December 2019. Both competitions for men and women were held.

Competition schedule

Participating nations
Five nations competed in softball at the 2019 Southeast Asian Games:

Medalists

Medal table

References

External links